Gaomiaocun  is a station on Line 1 of Chongqing Rail Transit in Shapingba District, Chongqing Municipality, China. It opened in 2011.

Station structure

References

Chongqing Rail Transit stations
Railway stations in China opened in 2011